The 2000 Big 12 Conference women's basketball championship is the 2000 edition of the Big 12 Conference's championship tournament. The tournament was held at the Municipal Auditorium in Kansas City, Missouri between March 7–9 and on March 12, 2000. Iowa State University won their first Big 12 Conference women's basketball tournament championship beating the University of Texas, 75–65.

Seeding
The Tournament consisted of a 12 team single-elimination tournament with the top 4 seeds receiving a bye.

Schedule

Tournament bracket

All-Tournament Team
Most Outstanding Player – Edwina Brown, Texas

See also
2000 Big 12 Conference men's basketball tournament
2000 NCAA Women's Division I Basketball Tournament
1999–2000 NCAA Division I women's basketball rankings

References

External links
Big 12 Tournament information

+
Big 12 Conference women's basketball tournament
Tournament
Big 12 Conference women's basketball tournament
Big 12 Conference women's basketball tournament